Dwayne Wright (born June 2, 1983) is a former American football running back. He was drafted by the Buffalo Bills in the fourth round of the 2007 NFL Draft. He played college football at Fresno State.

Wright was a member of the New York Giants, Philadelphia Eagles, Pittsburgh Steelers, Hartford Colonials and Toronto Argonauts. Retired as a Pittsburgh Steeler.

Early years
Wright prepped at Morse High School 9th,10th. Transferred to Lincoln High School in San Diego, California.

College career
Wright played college football at West Hills College Coalinga, CA. 2003 Transferred to Fresno State. He chose to forgo his Junior season and declare for the 2007 NFL Draft.

Professional career

Pre-draft
Wright was invited to the 2007 NFL Scouting Combine. He visited with the Atlanta Falcons, Buffalo Bills, Pittsburgh Steelers and Philadelphia Eagles before the draft.

Buffalo Bills
Wright was drafted by the Buffalo Bills in the fourth round of the 2007 NFL Draft. He was signed to a contract on July 25. He was waived and signed to New York Giants on August 30, 2009.

New York Giants
Wright was signed by the New York Giants on August 30, 2009.

Philadelphia Eagles
After working out for the Philadelphia Eagles on January 13, 2010, Wright was signed to a two-year contract by the Eagles on January 29. He was going to be converted to fullback after playing running back during his entire career. He was waived on August 1.

Pittsburgh Steelers
Wright was claimed off waivers from Philadelphia Eagles by the Pittsburgh Steelers on August 2, 2011.

Hartford Colonials
Wright was signed by the Hartford Colonials of the United Football League on September 9, 2012. He played one 1 game then was released due to contract Issues.

Toronto Argonauts
On October 5, 2012, Wright signed a practice roster agreement with the Toronto Argonauts of the Canadian Football League. He was released by the Argonauts on June 24, 2012.

References

External links
Just Sports Stats
Toronto Argonauts bio
Philadelphia Eagles bio
New York Giants bio
Fresno State Bulldogs bio

1983 births
Living people
Players of American football from San Diego
Players of Canadian football from San Diego
American football running backs
Fresno State Bulldogs football players
Buffalo Bills players
New York Giants players
Philadelphia Eagles players
Pittsburgh Steelers players
Hartford Colonials players